Brocky Peak, at  above sea level is the sixth highest peak in the Pioneer Mountains of Idaho. The peak is located on the border of Sawtooth and Salmon-Challis National Forests as well as Blaine and Custer counties. It is the 23rd highest peak in Idaho.

References 

Mountains of Idaho
Mountains of Blaine County, Idaho
Mountains of Custer County, Idaho
Salmon-Challis National Forest
Sawtooth National Forest